Cheshmeh Qassaban (also Romanized as Cheshmeh Qaşşābān, Chashmeh Qaşbān, and Cheshmeh Qaşaban) is a village in Alvandkuh-e Gharbi Rural District, in the Central District of Hamadan County, Hamadan Province, Iran. At the 2006 census, its population was 608, in 151 families.

References 

Populated places in Hamadan County